is a Japanese model and actress represented by Seventh Avenue. She is nicknamed .

Fujisawa is an exclusive model for non-no and More.

Filmography

Dramas

Films

Stage

Variety

Advertisements

Photo books

Magazines

References

External links
 

Japanese female models
Japanese actresses
1982 births
Living people
Actors from Kagawa Prefecture
Asadora lead actors
People from Takamatsu, Kagawa
Models from Kagawa Prefecture